Kasi Laine Kelly (born October 1, 1981) is a beauty queen from Bridgeport, Texas who has competed in the Miss USA pageant. She was born to Wiley and Toni Harkins Kelly. She has one sister named Kristi. 

Kelly won the Miss Texas USA 2002 title in a state pageant held in Lubbock, Texas on July 30, 2001.  She competed against over 100 other contestants as Miss Dallas-Fort Worth.  Her first runner-up was Stephanie Guerrero, who would go on to win the Miss Texas USA 2004 title, her second runner-up was Andria Mullins, who was Miss Texas Teen USA 1997, the third runner-up was Christie Lee Woods, Miss Texas Teen USA 1996 and Miss Teen USA 1996, and fourth runner-up was Candace Campfield, who would place in the top five of the pageant on three further occasions.  Among the semi-finalists were Mandy Jeffreys (Miss Texas Teen USA 1995), Lana Wright (crowned Miss Idaho USA 2003 the following year) and Tyler Willis (later Miss Texas USA 2005).

This was Kelly's third attempt at winning the title.  She first competed as Miss Metroplex in the 2000 event and placed in the top twelve.  In the 2001 event she competed as Miss Fort Worth and placed second runner-up behind Kandace Krueger, who would later win the Miss USA title.   She also won the Swimsuit award.

Kelly represented Texas in the Miss USA 2002 pageant broadcast live from Gary, Indiana on March 2, 2002.  She made the cut of twelve semi-finalists in the nationally televised pageant, placed eighth in the swimsuit competition with a score of 9.12, and fourth in evening gown (9.38), eventually finishing in eighth place.  The pageant was won by Shauntay Hinton of the District of Columbia.

References

External links
Miss Texas USA official website
  Miss USA official website 

Living people
Miss USA 2002 delegates
People from Bridgeport, Texas
1981 births